Club Deportivo Polillas Ceuta, abbreviated as CD Polillas Ceuta, is a football club based in the Spanish enclave of Ceuta, in North Africa.

CD Polillas Ceuta is reportedly experiencing a financial crisis because of COVID-19. After being taken over by BSG, the name of the club which was originally Gimnastica Ceuta was changed to CD Polillas Ceuta.

History
CD Polillas Ceuta was founded in 1996 by the name Gimnastica Ceuta and competed in the Segunda División, the second division of the Spanish football league system. Starting next season CD Ceuta senior will compete in the fifth division of the league system, the Tercera División. This season Gimnastica Ceuta finished 17th out of 18 participants in the Spanish U-19 League.

References

External links

Ceuta
Segunda División clubs
Association football clubs established in 1996